Asadabad, Azerbaijan may refer to:
Asadabad, Jalilabad
Əsədabad